Clark Burdick (January 13, 1868 – August 27, 1948) was a U.S. Representative from Rhode Island.

Born in Newport, Rhode Island, Burdick attended the public schools.
He was a student at the Harvard Law School 1893-1895.
He was admitted to the bar in 1894 and commenced practice in Newport.
He was also interested in banking and served as president of the Newport Trust Co..
He served as member of the First Division, Rhode Island Naval Militia, in 1896 and 1897.
He served as member of the city school board 1899-1901.
City solicitor of Newport in 1901, 1902, and again in 1907 and 1908.
He served as member of the State house of representatives 1906-1908.
He served as delegate to the Republican National Convention in 1912.
He served as member of the Newport representative council 1906-1916, serving as chairman.
He served in the State senate in 1915 and 1916.
Awarded the third class order of the Sacred Treasury of Japan for services rendered the representatives of the Emperor of Japan in 1917.
He served as mayor of Newport in 1917 and 1918.

Burdick was elected as a Republican to the Sixty-sixth and to the six succeeding Congresses (March 4, 1919 – March 3, 1933).
He was an unsuccessful candidate for reelection in 1932 to the Seventy-third Congress.
Reengaged in the practice of law and also in his banking interests in Newport, Rhode Island, until his death on August 27, 1948.
He was interred in St. Mary's Episcopal Cemetery, Portsmouth, Rhode Island.

Sources

1868 births
1948 deaths
Harvard Law School alumni
Republican Party members of the Rhode Island House of Representatives
Republican Party Rhode Island state senators
Mayors of Newport, Rhode Island
Republican Party members of the United States House of Representatives from Rhode Island